Martin Luther King Drive may refer to:

Martin Luther King Drive (Jersey City)
Martin Luther King Drive (Chicago)
Martin Luther King Jr. Drive (Philadelphia)
Martin Luther King Jr. Drive (Atlanta)
Martin Luther King Jr. Drive (Cleveland)
Martin Luther King Jr. Drive (St. Louis)

See also
List of streets named after Martin Luther King Jr.
Martin Luther King Jr. Boulevard (disambiguation)
Martin Luther King Jr. Expressway (disambiguation)
Martin Luther King Jr. Parkway (disambiguation)
Martin Luther King Jr. Way (disambiguation)